Heil Mishmar (abbreviated HIM) ( was the guard corps of the Haganah, a Jewish paramilitary organization in Mandatory Palestine.

History

HIM was founded in 1939, following the 1936–1939 Arab revolt in Palestine. It included mostly older and less healthy soldiers (usually between 35 and 50), while those who were able to participate in field combat were drafted into the Field Corps and later also Palmach. At the end of World War II, the Guard Corps consisted of more than 30,000 members country-wide. It was responsible for guarding Jewish villages from attacks, especially by Arab gangs.

References

Haganah units